Orlando Mercado Rodríguez (born November 7, 1961) is a Puerto Rican former professional baseball player. He played all or parts of eight seasons in Major League Baseball with the Seattle Mariners, Texas Rangers, Detroit Tigers, Los Angeles Dodgers, Oakland Athletics, Minnesota Twins, New York Mets, and Montreal Expos. From 2003 to 2010, he was the bullpen coach for the Los Angeles Angels of Anaheim. After the 2010 season, Mercado moved to the position of roving catching instructor for the Angels.

Mercado became a local star for his play in the Portland Beavers Triple-A franchise in 1989. He was inducted into the Hispanic Heritage Baseball Museum Hall of Fame on May 22, 2004 in a pregame on-field ceremony at Angel Stadium in Anaheim, California.

Mercado currently serves as a catching coordinator with the Los Angeles Angels.

External links

Baseball Almanac

1961 births
Living people
Albuquerque Dukes players
Anaheim Angels coaches
Bellingham Mariners players
Charlotte Knights players
Detroit Tigers players
Iowa Cubs players
Los Angeles Angels of Anaheim coaches
Los Angeles Dodgers players
Lynn Sailors players
Major League Baseball bullpen catchers
Major League Baseball bullpen coaches
Major League Baseball catchers
Major League Baseball players from Puerto Rico
Montreal Expos players
Minnesota Twins players
New York Mets players
Oakland Athletics players
Oklahoma City 89ers players
People from Arecibo, Puerto Rico
Portland Beavers players
Puerto Rican expatriate baseball players in Canada
Salt Lake City Gulls players
San Jose Missions players
Seattle Mariners players
Spokane Indians players
Tacoma Tigers players
Texas Rangers players
Tidewater Tides players
Vancouver Canadians players